Sacred Hill is a disappeared hill in Kowloon, Hong Kong. It is where a historical boulder called Sung Wong Toi was previously located. Sacred Hill is also known as Hill of the King of Sung in some old maps. The name "Sacred Hill" is widely believed to be a name given by foreigners as no earlier corresponding Chinese name is known.

It is believed that Emperor Duanzong of the Southern Song Dynasty had settled on the hill for a period of time when he was escaping from Yuan troops. The hill was partly flattened during the Japanese Occupation of Hong Kong, when the Japanese determined to expand the nearby Kai Tak Airport at the expense of the sacred hill. The rest of the hill was levelled during the 1950s for further airport expansion. The remaining part of the Sung Wong Toi relic was moved to the Sung Wong Toi Garden, immediately west of the former Sacred Hill.

During work on the Kai Tak Development, many relics from the Song and Yuan periods have been found in the environs of Sacred Hill.

References

Further reading

External links

 Gwulo entry

Mountains, peaks and hills of Hong Kong
Kowloon City District
Ma Tau Chung